Sudan, officially the Republic of the Sudan, is a country in North Africa. In 2010, Sudan was considered the 17th-fastest-growing economy in the world and the rapid development of the country largely from oil profits even when facing international sanctions was noted by The New York Times in a 2006 article. Because of the secession of South Sudan, which contained over 80 percent of Sudan's oilfields, the economic forecast for Sudan in 2011 and beyond is uncertain.

Notable firms 
This list includes notable companies with primary headquarters located in the country. The industry and sector follow the Industry Classification Benchmark taxonomy. Organizations which have ceased operations are included and noted as defunct.

See also 
 Economy of Sudan
 List of airlines of Sudan
 List of banks in Sudan

References

External links 

 
Economy of Sudan-related lists
 
Sudan